Etchegaray (forename unknown) was a French Basque pelotari who competed at the 1900 Summer Olympics in Paris, France.

Etchegaray competed in the only official pelota contest in Olympic history, the Basque pelota at the 1900 Summer Olympics two-man teams event. He and his partner Maurice Durquetty withdrew before the event, thus losing by forfeit to the team of Spain, José de Amézola y Aspizúa and Francisco Villota.

References
 De Wael, Herman. Herman's Full Olympians: "Pelota 1900". Accessed 25 February 2006.

External links
 

Pelotaris at the 1900 Summer Olympics
Olympic pelotaris of France
Place of birth missing
French pelotaris
Year of birth missing
Year of death missing
Place of death missing
Missing middle or first names